Odd Sverressøn Klingenberg (8 June 1871 – 3 November 1944) was a Norwegian barrister and politician for the Conservative Party. He served as the Minister of Social Affairs 1920-1921, 1923 and 1923-1924 in addition to mayor of Trondheim 1911-1916.

He was born in Trondhjem as a son of attorney Sverre Olafssøn Klingenberg (1844–1913) and Hilda Johannesdatter Klingenberg (1843–1912). He was a brother of Sverre, Olav and Kaare Sverressøn Klingenberg and a grandson and grandnephew of engineer Johannes Benedictus Klingenberg.

References

1871 births
1944 deaths
Mayors of Trondheim
Conservative Party (Norway) politicians
Members of the Storting
Government ministers of Norway
Odd